The City Hall, Cork is a civic building in Cork, Ireland which houses the administrative headquarters of Cork City Council.

History 
The current building is likely the 6th or 7th city hall to have existed in Cork city.

In 1833, the original building on the site was completed, when the city's corn exchange was moved from Corn Market Street to Albert Quay. The corn exchange was designed by Cork architect Henry Hill, and constructed by Sir Thomas Deane. In 1852 the building was converted and expanded upon by Sir John Benson to facilitate the Cork Exhibition, opening on 10 June 1852. In 1883, following the closure of the exhibition, the building was offered to the Cork Corporation at a price of IR£10,000 and became property of the Corporation in 1893, following the passing of the Cork Corn Markets Act, 1889. The building was opened to the public as a city hall in roughly 1903, and a brass plaque commemorating this event is on display in the Cork Public Museum. This original city hall was destroyed on 11 December 1920 by the Black and Tans during the Irish War of Independence as part of the Burning of Cork.

Following a design competition, designs by Alfred Jones and Stephen Kelly (Jones and Kelly architects, based in Dublin) were selected, and the construction contract for the replacement civic buildings awarded to John Sisk & Son. The foundation stone of the new City Hall building was laid by Éamon de Valera on 9 July 1932. The cost of this new building was provided by the British Government in the 1930s as a gesture of reconciliation. On 24 April 1935, Cork Corporation held a meeting in the new hall for the first time, when the Council Chambers were first opened. The City Hall was officially opened by de Valera on 8 September 1936.

Architecture 
The structure's entry in the National Inventory of Architectural Heritage describes it as one of the city's "monumental classical buildings" and its site as important. Unlike the original city hall, the current building originally didn't bear the city arms on its exterior, though it does feature mosaics of the arms contemporaneous with the building's construction on both the floor of the entrance hall and also on the tympanum above the stage of the concert hall. In 1985, as part of commemorations of the 800th year of the Cork Charter, a limestone plinth bearing the arms was erected outside the building.

The building is faced with dressed limestone quarried in Little Island.

A major extension was completed by ABK Architects in 2007 and opened that year.

See also
 List of public art in Cork

References

Notes

Sources

 

Buildings and structures in Cork (city)
Cork
Government buildings in the Republic of Ireland
Government buildings completed in 1935
20th-century architecture in the Republic of Ireland